Europipe could be:

Europipe I  - a natural gas pipeline between the Draupner E riser platform in the North Sea and the Dornum terminal in Germany
Europipe II  - a natural gas pipeline between the Kårstø processing plant in Norway and the Dornum terminal in Germany
EUROPIPE - a German manufacturer of steel pipes